Avon Park is a city in Highlands County, Florida, United States. As of the 2010 census the population was 8,836, and in 2018 the estimated population was 10,695. It is the oldest city in Highlands County, and was named after Stratford-upon-Avon, England.

History
The first permanent white settler in Avon Park was Oliver Martin Crosby, a Connecticut native who moved to the area in 1884 to study the wildlife of the Everglades. By 1886, enough people had followed that the town of "Lake Forest" was founded. As president of the Florida Development Company, he recruited settlers to the area, many of whom were from England, including many from the town of Stratford-upon-Avon, who gave the town its name.

In 2006, then-mayor Thomas Macklin (Republican) proposed City Ordinance 08-06, which would have blocked the issuance or renewal of city licenses to businesses that hired undocumented aliens, fined any property owner who rented and leased property to undocumented aliens, and established English as the city's official language, banning the use of other languages during the conduct of official business except where specified under state or federal law. The ordinance was defeated by the city council, on a 3–2 vote.

Geography

Avon Park is located in northwestern Highlands County at  (27.594418, –81.503437). 27/98 is the main highway through the city, leading north  to Lake Wales and south  to Sebring. Florida State Road 17 (Main Street) leads east through the center of Avon Park, then south 10 miles to the center of Sebring. Florida State Road 64 leads west from Avon Park  to Zolfo Springs.

The city is located in a karst landscape underlain by the limestone Florida Platform, and numerous circular lakes are either within the city limits (Lake Tulane, Lake Verona, and Lake Isis) or border the city (Lake Anoka, Lake Lelia, Lake Glenada, Lake Lotela, Lake Denton, Little Red Water Lake, Pioneer Lake, Lake Brentwood, Lake Byrd, Lake Damon, and Lake Lillian).

Demographics

At the 2000 census, there were 8,542 people, 3,218 households and 2,114 families residing in the city. The racial makeup of the city was 58.90% White, 29.2% African American, 0.32% Native American, 0.69% Asian, 0.05% Pacific Islander, 8.35% from other races, and 2.28% from two or more races. Hispanic or Latino of any race were 18.71% of the population.

There were 3,218 households, of which 28.1% had children under the age of 18 living with them, 43.6% were married couples living together, 17.2% had a female householder with no husband present, and 34.3% were non-families. 28.2% of all households were made up of individuals, and 14.7% had someone living alone who was 65 years of age or older. The average household size was 2.59 and the average family size was 3.08.

Age distribution was 26.5% under the age of 18, 11.1% from 18 to 24, 23.6% from 25 to 44, 18.3% from 45 to 64, and 20.5% who were 65 years of age or older. The median age was 36 years. For every 100 females, there were 97.8 males. For every 100 females age 18 and over, there were 94.2 males.

The median household income was $23,576, and the median family income was $27,617. Males had a median income of $21,890 versus $18,678 for females. The per capita income for the city was $11,897. About 21.3% of families and 27.6% of the population were below the poverty line, including 40.4% of those under age 18 and 13.4% of those age 65 or over.

At the 2010 census, there where 8,836 people, 3,337 households, and 4,162 housing units in the city. The racial make up of the city was 55.5% white (41.3% non-hispanic white), 28.1% African American, 0.3% Native American, 0.8% Asian, 0% Native Hawaiian and Other Pacific Islander, and 4.3% from two or more races. Hispanic or Latino of any race were 29.2% of the population. 12.9% of the population was foreign born. The median household income was $28,496, the per capita income was $14,911, and 36.2% of the population lived below the poverty line. 51.8% of the population was female.

Government
Avon Park operates under a council-manager form of government, with a city manager who operates under the direction of an elected four-member council and mayor. The current Mayor is Garrett Anderson, and the City Manager is Mark C. Schrader. The city provides fire protection, utilities, and sanitation service to its residents. The city's police and the county sheriff work jointly to provide law enforcement.

Transportation

Education

Public schools
Avon Elementary School
Park Elementary School
Memorial Elementary School
Avon Park Middle School
Avon Park High School

Private schools
 Walker Memorial Academy 
 Central Florida Academy
 Parkview Pre-K LLC
 Community Christian Academy
Cornerstone Christian Academy

Colleges
 South Florida State College

Media

Television

Avon Park is located in a fringe viewing area; its television stations originate in distant cities. Local television services offer signals from WFTV, the ABC affiliate in Orlando; WINK-TV, the CBS affiliate in Fort Myers/Naples; WFLA-TV, the Tampa Bay area NBC affiliate; and WTVT, the Tampa Bay area Fox affiliate.

Radio

Avon Park is in the Sebring radio market, which is ranked as the 288th largest in the United States by Arbitron. Radio stations broadcasting from Avon Park include WAVP/1390 (Adult Hits), WAPQ-LP/95.9 (Religious), WWOJ/99.1 (Country) "OJ99.1" & WWMA-LP/107.9 (Religious).

Newspapers
Local print media includes the News-Sun, a newspaper published on Wednesday, Friday, and Sunday. Highlands Today, a daily local supplement to The Tampa Tribune that covered events in Highlands County, was bought by and merged into The Highlands News Sun in 2016.

Points of interest
 Avon Park Air Force Range
 Avon Park Historic District
 Lake Adelaide

Notable people

 Red Causey, was a right-handed Major League Baseball pitcher who played for the New York Giants
 Dee Gordon, Major League Baseball, Seattle Mariners second baseman
 Nick Gordon, a professional MLB shortstop in the Minnesota Twins organization 
 Tom Gordon, Major League Baseball pitcher
 Fred L. Lowery, Southern Baptist pastor and author, formerly resided in Avon Park
 Hal McRae, Kansas City Royals Hall of Fame
 Conrad Henry Moehlman, Baptist author and emeritus professor of church history
 Deanie Parrish, aviator
 The father of the perpetrator Melinda Loveless, accused of murdering Shanda Sharer lived there after he divorced

Climate
The climate in this area is characterized by hot, humid summers and warm winters. According to the Köppen climate classification system, Avon Park has a humid subtropical climate (Cfa).

References

External links

City of Avon Park
Highlands News-Sun

 
Cities in Highlands County, Florida
Populated places established in 1884
Cities in Florida
1884 establishments in Florida